Dorman Branch is a  long 1st order tributary to Love Creek in Sussex County, Delaware.

Course
Dorman Branch rises on the Hetty Fisher Glade divide in Sussex County, Delaware.  Dorman Branch then flows southeast to meet Love Creek at Robinson Landing.

Watershed
Dorman Branch drains  of area, receives about 45.3 in/year of precipitation, has a topographic wetness index of 565.22 and is about 11.56% forested.

See also
List of rivers of Delaware

References 

Rivers of Delaware